"So Sexy" is a song by American rapper Twista featuring vocals and sole production from American singer R. Kelly. Released as the third single from the former's  fourth studio album, Kamikaze (2004), it was Twista's third straight top 40 hit from the album, having peaked at number 25 on the Billboard Hot 100. "So Sexy" was followed by "So Sexy: Chapter II (Like This)" which also made it to the Billboard charts.

Single track listing
"So Sexy" (Explicit Album Version)- 3:51  
"So Sexy: Chapter II (Like This)" (Explicit Album Version)- 4:03  
"So Sexy" (A Capella)- 2:57  
"So Sexy" (Instrumental)- 2:57  
"So Sexy: Chapter II (Like This)" (Instrumental)- 4:03

Charts

Release history

References

2004 songs
2004 singles
Music videos directed by Marcus Raboy
R. Kelly songs
Twista songs
Song recordings produced by R. Kelly
Songs written by R. Kelly
Songs written by Twista
Atlantic Records singles